The Wadi Halfa Salient, named after Wadi Halfa, a nearby Sudanese city 22 kilometers south of the border, is a salient of the international border between Egypt and the Sudan along the Nile River to the north. The area is currently controlled by Egypt. The area (along with the Halaib Triangle and Bir Tawil) is created by two different definitions of the Egypt–Sudan border: the "political boundary" set in 1899, and the "administrative boundary" set in 1902.

History
In 1899, the border between the Anglo-Egyptian Sudan and Egypt was defined by the condominium treaty to run along the 22nd degree north of latitude. However, access to the area north of the border along the Nile River and consequently the administration of the population of the area were easier from the Sudan. Therefore, in 1902 a new administrative border was established, deviating north of the 22nd degree north of latitude along the Nile River, thereby placing this area under Sudanese administration.

Besides the Wadi Halfa Salient, there are two more areas where the administrative border deviated from the 22nd degree north of latitude, both to the east of Wadi Halfa: the Halaib Triangle on the Red Sea coast, north of the original 1899 border, and the much smaller area around Bir Tawil, south of the original border.

Political situation
Egypt claims the more favorable original border of 1899 along the 22nd degree north of latitude and therefore claims both the Halaib Triangle and the Wadi Halfa Salient, but not the Bir Tawil area. Since Sudan claims the amended border of 1902, it claims the same areas as Egypt, while no country claims the Bir Tawil area, making it de facto a terra nullius. While there have been disputes about the Halaib Triangle and military occupation by Egypt, the small area of the Wadi Halfa Salient remained out of the headlines because most of the area is flooded by Lake Nasser.

Geography
Because of the construction of the Aswan Dam and the flooding of Lake Nasser most of the area was flooded, affecting most of the villages of the area and the ancient city of Faras. Some of the people were resettled to New Halfa in the Butana region.

After a detailed map of 1953, before the flooding, 52 villages could be counted in the area, of which 24 were west of the Nile River (17 with names on the map), and 29 east of the river (12 with names), and one unnamed village on the Faras Island in the river. The largest town and only one with a population exceeding 2000 was Dubayrah.

A land area of only about  remains in the salient, most of it on the eastern banks, a desolate rocky area nearly devoid of vegetation. A superimposition of the map with current NASA WorldWind satellite images shows the extent of flooding in the area of the salient. All villages shown on the map disappeared in the reservoir.

See also
Bir Tawil
Egypt–Sudan border
Halaib Triangle

References

External links 
 Sudan – Egypt (United Arab Republic) Boundary. International Boundary Study. No. 18 – July 27, 1962.

Egypt–Sudan border
Nile
Lake Nasser
Disputed territories in Africa